Kani Ali Gordeh (also Romanized as Kānī ‘Alī Gordeh) is a village in Akhtachi-ye Mahali Rural District, Simmineh District, Bukan County, West Azerbaijan Province, Iran. At the 2006 census, its population was 116, in 18 families.

References 

Populated places in Bukan County